Straneoa is a genus of ground beetles in the family Carabidae. There are at least two described species in Straneoa, found in islands off the west coast of Africa.

Species
These two species belong to the genus Straneoa:
 Straneoa collatata (Karsch, 1881)  (Fernando Poo)
 Straneoa seligmani Kavanaugh, 2005  (Sao Tome)

References

Platyninae